The 2023 Spanish local elections will be held on Sunday, 28 May 2023, to elect all councillors in the municipalities of Spain and all 1,038 seats in 38 provincial deputations. The elections will be held simultaneously with regional elections in twelve autonomous communities, as well as local elections in the three foral deputations of the Basque Country, the four island councils in the Balearic Islands and the seven island cabildos in the Canary Islands.

The elections will take place following a period of unstability dominated by the outbreak of the COVID-19 pandemic in March 2020 and its political and economical consequences, including the worst worldwide recession since the Great Depression resulting from the massive lockdowns enforced to reduce the spread of SARS-CoV-2, as well as the economic impact of the 2022 Russian invasion of Ukraine.

Electoral system

Municipal elections
Municipalities in Spain are local corporations with independent legal personality. They have a governing body, the municipal council or corporation, composed of the mayor, the government council and the elected plenary assembly. Elections to the local councils in Spain are fixed for the fourth Sunday of May every four years.

Voting for the local assemblies is on the basis of universal suffrage, which comprises all nationals over 18 years of age, registered and residing in the corresponding municipality and in full enjoyment of their political rights, as well as resident non-national European citizens and those whose country of origin allows Spanish nationals to vote in their own elections by virtue of a treaty. Local councillors are elected using the D'Hondt method and a closed list proportional representation, with an electoral threshold of five percent of valid votes—which includes blank ballots—being applied in each local council. Parties not reaching the threshold are not taken into consideration for seat distribution. Councillors are allocated to municipal councils based on the following scale:

Councillors of municipalities with populations below 250 inhabitants are elected under an open list partial block voting, with electors voting for individual candidates instead of parties: for up to four candidates in municipalities with populations between 100 and 250 inhabitants; and for up to two candidates in municipalities below 100. This does not apply to municipalities which, as a result of their geographical location or the convenience of a better management of municipal interests or other circumstances, make it advisable to be organized through the open council system, in which voters will directly elect the local mayor.

The mayor is indirectly elected by the plenary assembly. A legal clause requires that mayoral candidates earn the vote of an absolute majority of councillors, or else the candidate of the most-voted party in the assembly shall be automatically appointed to the post. In the event of a tie, a toss-up will determine the appointee.

The electoral law allows for parties and federations registered in the interior ministry, coalitions and groupings of electors to present lists of candidates. Parties and federations intending to form a coalition ahead of an election are required to inform the relevant Electoral Commission within ten days of the election call, whereas groupings of electors need to secure the signature of a determined amount of the electors registered in the municipality for which they seek election:

At least one percent of the electors in municipalities with a population below 5,000 inhabitants, provided that the number of signers is more than double that of councillors at stake.
At least 100 signatures in municipalities with a population between 5,001 and 10,000.
At least 500 signatures in municipalities with a population between 10,001 and 50,000.
At least 1,500 signatures in municipalities with a population between 50,001 and 150,000.
At least 3,000 signatures in municipalities with a population between 150,001 and 300,000.
At least 5,000 signatures in municipalities with a population between 300,001 and 1,000,000.
At least 8,000 signatures in municipalities with a population over 1,000,001.

Electors are disallowed from signing for more than one list of candidates.

Deputations and island councils
Provincial deputations are the governing bodies of provinces in Spain, having an administration role of municipal activities and composed of a provincial president, an administrative body, and a plenary. Basque provinces have foral deputations instead—called Juntas Generales—, whereas deputations for single-province autonomous communities were abolished and their functions transferred to the corresponding regional parliaments in 1982–1983. For insular provinces, such as the Balearic and Canary Islands, deputations are replaced by island councils in each of the islands or group of islands. For Majorca, Menorca, Ibiza and Formentera this figure is referred to in Spanish as consejo insular, whereas for Gran Canaria, Tenerife, Fuerteventura, La Gomera, El Hierro, Lanzarote and La Palma its name is cabildo insular.

Most deputations are indirectly elected by local councillors from municipalities in each judicial district. Seats are allocated to provincial deputations based on the following scale:

Island councils and foral deputations are elected directly by electors under their own, specific electoral regulations.

Timetable
The key dates are listed below (all times are CET. Note that the Canary Islands use WET (UTC+0) instead):

3 April: The election decree will be issued with the countersign of the Prime Minister, ratified by the King.
4 April: Publication of the election decree in the Official State Gazette (BOE) and beginning of a suspension period of events for the inauguration of public works, services or projects.
7 April: Initial constitution of provincial and zone electoral commissions.
14 April: Deadline for parties and federations intending to enter into a coalition to inform the relevant electoral commission.
24 April: Deadline for parties, federations, coalitions, and groupings of electors to present lists of candidates to the relevant electoral commission.
26 April: Submitted lists of candidates are provisionally published in the BOE.
29 April: Deadline for citizens entered in the Register of Absent Electors Residing Abroad (CERA) and for citizens temporarily absent from Spain to apply for voting.
30 April: Deadline for parties, federations, coalitions, and groupings of electors to rectify irregularities in their lists.
1 May: Official proclamation of valid submitted lists of candidates.
2 May: Proclaimed lists are published in the BOE.
12 May: Official start of electoral campaigning.
18 May: Deadline to apply for postal voting.
23 May: Official start of legal ban on electoral opinion polling publication, dissemination or reproduction and deadline for CERA citizens to vote by mail.
24 May: Deadline for postal and temporarily absent voters to issue their votes.
26 May: Last day of official electoral campaigning and deadline for CERA citizens to vote in a ballot box in the relevant consular office or division.
27 May: Official 24-hour ban on political campaigning prior to the general election (reflection day).
28 May: Polling day (polling stations open at 9 am and close at 8 pm or once voters present in a queue at/outside the polling station at 8 pm have cast their vote). Provisional counting of votes starts immediately.

Opinion polls

Results

City control
The following table lists party control in provincial capitals, as well as in municipalities with a population above or around 75,000. Gains for a party are highlighted in that party's colour.

Deputation control
The following table lists party control in provincial deputations. Gains for a party are highlighted in that party's colour.

See also
2023 Basque foral elections
2023 Ceuta Assembly election
2023 Barcelona City Council election
2023 Madrid City Council election
2023 Melilla Assembly election
2023 Seville City Council election
2023 Valencia City Council election

References

2023 elections in Spain
May 2023 events in Spain
Future elections in Spain
2023